Thulani Thembela (born 22 August 2000) is a South African cricketer. He made his first-class debut for Easterns in the 2018–19 CSA 3-Day Provincial Cup on 11 October 2018.

References

External links
 

2000 births
Living people
South African cricketers
Easterns cricketers
Place of birth missing (living people)